Several concepts from mathematics and physics are named after the mathematician and astronomer Joseph-Louis Lagrange, as are a crater on the moon and a street in Paris.

Lagrangian
Lagrangian analysis
Lagrangian coordinates
Lagrangian derivative
Lagrangian drifter
Lagrangian foliation
Lagrangian Grassmannian
Lagrangian intersection Floer homology
Lagrangian mechanics
Relativistic Lagrangian mechanics
Lagrangian (field theory)
Lagrangian system
Lagrangian mixing
Lagrangian point
Lagrangian relaxation
Lagrangian submanifold
Lagrangian subspace
Nonlocal Lagrangian
Proca lagrangian
Special Lagrangian submanifold

Lagrange
Euler–Lagrange equation
Green–Lagrange strain
Lagrange bracket
Lagrange–Bürmann formula
Lagrange–d'Alembert principle
Lagrange error bound
Lagrange form
Lagrange form of the remainder
Lagrange interpolation
Lagrange invariant
Lagrange inversion theorem
Lagrange multiplier
Augmented Lagrangian method
Lagrange number
Lagrange point colonization
Lagrange polynomial
Lagrange property
Lagrange reversion theorem
Lagrange resolvent
Lagrange spectrum
Lagrange stability
Lagrange stream function
Lagrange top
Lagrange−Sylvester interpolation

Lagrange's
Lagrange's approximation theorem
Lagrange's formula
Lagrange's identity
Lagrange's identity (boundary value problem)
Lagrange's mean value theorem
Lagrange's notation
Lagrange's theorem (group theory)
Lagrange's theorem (number theory)
Lagrange's four-square theorem
Lagrange's trigonometric identities

Non-mathematical
Lagrange point colonization
Lagrange (crater)
Lagrange Island, Antarctica
Lagrange Island (Australia)
Rue Lagrange, a street in Paris
Via Giuseppe Luigi Lagrange, in Turin, the street where the house of his birth still stands.

Lagrange, a character from the 2017 rhythm game Arcaea
Lagrange, Joseph Louis
L